The Lone Descent is the fifth studio album by the Danish band Of the Wand & the Moon, released on 10 October 2011 through Heiðrunar Myrkrunar.

Reception

Berlingskes Jeppe Krogsgaard Christensen, Politikens Simon Lund and Gaffas Finn P. Madsen all gave The Lone Descent a rating of five out of six. Krogsgaard Christensen described it as Of the Wand & the Moon's "artistic culmination". Lund wrote that the fundamental neofolk concept has remained the same from the previous album, but "the texture has become many layers thicker"; Madsen wrote that the band has moved further away from previous models, such as Current 93 and Death in June, and closer to Lee Hazlewood and Phil Spector's "Wall of Sound". Krogsgaard Christensen highlighted the track "Tear It Apart" and wrote that the combination of melancholy, beautiful melodies and musical ambition on every track is "brilliant". Lund wrote that the "captivating melodies" should make it possible for the album to attract some international attention, and Madsen called it "absolutely one of the best Danish releases of the year".

Track listing

References

2011 albums
Neofolk albums
Apocalyptic folk albums
Industrial albums by Danish artists